The Upgrades were a third wave ska band from Dublin, Ireland. Goldenplec.com named them as their "band of the week"" during March 2009 and hailed them as Probably the best known unknown band in Dublin.
In 2006 they opened the Irish date of the International "Taste of Chaos Tour", sharing the stage with well-known bands such as Taking Back Sunday, Alexisonfire and Anti-Flag. They announced their split-up on March 26, 2010 on their Myspace blog. They played two farewell shows in April in Dublin one on the 4th with American punk rockers The Lawrence Arms and another on the 8th with Dublin Pop-Punk band Jody Has A Hitlist.

Album
The Upgrades debut 12-track album, Take A Risk, was released in 2009 on May 4. The band played in Dublin venue The Academy to support the launch of the album.

Track listing

 The Thing Is
 Rock’n’Fuck’n’Roll
 Square One
 You Should Know
 Nothing
 Angel Of Horror
 Bukkake (no regrets)
 Wrong About Me
 Better Way
 Somethin, I Dunno...
 Friends & Idiots
 This Is Us

Exposure
As well as playing alongside the likes of Taking Back Sunday and Anti-Flag the band were also selected to open the main stage at Europe’s biggest ska-punk festival - Mighty Sounds 2008 in Prague. They also performed at one of Ireland's biggest music festivals, Electric Picnic.

References

External links
 The Upgrades on Myspace
  The Upgrades Bebo page

Irish punk rock groups